Gara Garayev Monument – is a monument raised in Baku in the honour of the composer Gara Garayev (1918–1982).

Description 
The height of the monument is 3.5 meters. It is made of granite.

The monument is located behind the Nizami cinema, next to the Baku Music Academy and the residential building where the composer lived.

The monuments authors are the Peoples Artist of Azerbaijan, the sculptor Fazil Najafov and the Honoured Architect of Azerbaijan Rahim Seifullayev.

Before starting the work, the sculptor Fazil Najafov studied the life and the work of Gara Garayev, according to the sculptor: “Garayevs music has filled my soul”, he understood that the statue should be complex, ambiguously perceived, carry something new, depicting non-conventional features...

Initially, they thought to create the sculpture quickly, the authors planned that the statue would be a seated or standing figure, but several versions were made, the work took three years.

Unveiling 
The unveiling ceremony of the monument to the composer Gara Garayev took place on 3 February 2014 with the participation of the President of Azerbaijan Ilham Aliyev, the First Lady Mehriban Aliyeva, and the son of the composer Faraj Garayev.

See also 
 Aliagha Vahid Monument
 Jafar Jabbarli Monument
 Mustafa Kemal Atatürk Monument, Baku

References

Monuments and memorials in Baku